The Philadelphia History Museum was a public history museum located in Center City, Philadelphia from 1938 until 2018. The museum occupied architect John Haviland's landmark Greek Revival structure built in 1824–1826 for the Franklin Institute. The Museum operated as a city agency as part of Philadelphia's Department of Recreation. The building was listed on the National Register of Historic Places on August 1, 1979.

History
The museum was established through the efforts of Philadelphia Mayor S. Davis Wilson, Frances Wistar, president of the Philadelphia Society for the Preservation of Landmarks, and A. Atwater Kent, radio pioneer and inventor. In 1938 Kent purchased the former Franklin Institute building, which the Institute had vacated in 1933, and gifted the building to the city for use as a public history museum. Following renovations carried out by the Works Progress Administration, the Museum opened in 1941.

After years of declining attendance and financial shortfalls, the museum closed its doors in 2018. In September 2019, the city approved a plan to transfer the museum's collections to Drexel University who would preserve the collections and offer them out for loan. The case remains with the courts as of the Spring of 2022.

Collection
The Museum's collections included more than 80,000 objects related to Philadelphia and regional history, including an estimated 10,000 17th- to 20th-century artifacts transferred from the Historical Society of Pennsylvania art and artifact collection in 2009, 1700 Quaker-related items from Friends Historical Association Collection, and collections reflecting Philadelphia manufacturing, the 1876 Centennial Exposition, toys and miniatures, and radio broadcasting.

Highlights from the permanent exhibitions included the boxing gloves of Joe Frazier, the desk of George Washington, a drinking glass owned by Benjamin Franklin, and a wampum belt allegedly given to William Penn by the Lenape.

See also

References
Notes

Bibliography
 Weigley,  et al. Philadelphia: A 300 Year History. New York: W.W. Norton, 1982.

External links

 Official website
 Virtual Tour of Philadelphia's stop at the Atwater Kent
 Philadelphia department of recreation
 Building listing, photograph, and drawings at the Historic American Buildings Survey
 Building listing, history, and images at Philadelphia Architects and Buildings

Museums in Philadelphia
City museums in the United States
History museums in Pennsylvania
National Register of Historic Places in Philadelphia
Museums established in 1938
Works Progress Administration in Pennsylvania
Market East, Philadelphia
1938 establishments in Pennsylvania
Greek Revival architecture in Pennsylvania
Cultural infrastructure completed in 1825
John Haviland buildings
Defunct museums in Pennsylvania